Joe M. Boyd (May 5, 1917 – June 1, 2009) was an American football player and evangelist. Boyd attended Texas A&M University where he played at the tackle position on the undefeated national champion 1939 Texas A&M Aggies football team. He was selected by the Sporting News, Collier's Weekly magazine, the New York Sun, Boys' Life magazine, and the Collegiate Writers as a first-team player on the 1939 College Football All-America Team.  After leaving Texas A&M, Boyd became an evangelist and preacher.

References

1917 births
1997 deaths
American football tackles
Texas A&M Aggies football players
Players of American football from Texas
People from Jacksonville, Texas